Jean-François Delmas (14 April 1861 – 29 September 1933), or Francisque Delmas was a French bass-baritone who created roles in many French operas including Athanaël in Thaïs.

Delmas was born in Lyon and studied at the Paris Conservatoire winning first prizes for operatic singing. He made his debut in 1886 as Saint-Bris in Les Huguenots at the Paris Opéra. He remained with that company until 1927 and rarely sang outside France. He was known for the power and evenness of his voice with a sonorous quality in the bass range and an extended upper register, which allowed him to sing classic baritone roles such as Iago. Outside France he appeared at the Mariinsky in St Petersburg, the San Carlo in Lisbon, and the Monte Carlo Opera House in Monaco. 
His recordings for G&T, Pathé, Zonophone, Fonotipia, Odéon, and Opéra-Saphir are highly sought after by collectors.

He also created roles in Le Mage (Amrou), Messidor (Mathias), L'etranger (l'Etranger), Ariane (Périthoüs), Monna Vanna (Marco Colonna), Roma (Fabius), and sang in the Paris premiere of Fervaal (Arfagard).

Delmas died in Saint-Alban-de-Montbel (near Chambéry) at the age of 72, and is buried in the Cimetière Saint-Vincent de Montmartre with his wife, the soprano Blanche d'Ervilly (1853–1920).

Notes and references

Sources
Landru, Philippe, Cimetière Saint-Vincent de Montmartre, Cimetières de France et d'ailleurs, 2009
Giroud, Vincent, Liner Notes: Meyerbeer on Record 1899-1913, Marston Records, 2009
Steane, J. B., "Delmas, Jean-François" in Laura Williams Macy (ed.), The Grove Book of Opera Singers, Oxford University Press, 2008, P. 115. 
Warrack, John Hamilton and West, Ewan (eds.), "Delmas. Francisque", The Concise Oxford Dictionary of Opera, Oxford University Press, 1996, pp. 121–122.

External links
Historic Opera – Postcards showing Delmas as Phur in Xavier Leroux's Astarté and in the title role of Mozart's Don Giovanni
Audio file on Archive.org – Delmas singing "Bénédiction des Poignards" ("Blessing of the Daggers") from Les Huguenots

1861 births
1933 deaths
Operatic bass-baritones
Musicians from Lyon
Conservatoire de Paris alumni
19th-century French male opera singers
20th-century French male opera singers